Donald Douglas Waddell (born August 19, 1958) is American professional ice hockey executive and former player. He is the president and general manager of the Carolina Hurricanes.

Playing career
Waddell was selected 111th overall, in the 1978 NHL Amateur Draft. He was selected as the 3rd choice of the Los Angeles Kings on June 15, 1978. He played in the NHL for only one game with the Kings during the 1980–81 season, against the New York Rangers on January 28, 1981.

His playing career consisted mostly of minor and college hockey. He played 4 seasons at Northern Michigan University. He was one of the final cuts for the 1980 U.S. men's hockey team after he broke his leg in a pre-tournament game. He won the International Hockey League's Governor's Trophy in 1982 for best defenseman during the regular season.

Coaching career
After his tenure as a player, he moved to coaching for the 1987–88 season with the IHL Flint Spirits as a player-coach. For the next two seasons, he moved behind the bench permanently. Waddell moved on to the IHL San Diego Gulls for the 1991–92 season.  Waddell took over as interim coach of the Atlanta Thrashers during the 2002–03 season with a record of 4–5–1–0 as coach before Bob Hartley was  named to the permanent job.

After a disappointing start (0–6–0) to the 2007–08 Atlanta Thrashers season, Waddell was named interim head coach of the team following the dismissal of Bob Hartley. For several months, he was able to lead the team on a turn around, but the Thrashers ultimately played poorly down the stretch and missed the playoffs.

Coaching record

Management career

Early career
Waddell's first front office experience came with the International Hockey League's Flint Spirits during the 1988–89 season when he served in the dual role of head coach and general manager. He moved into Flint's front office exclusively for the 1989–90 season before joining the IHL's San Diego Gulls. He was vice president and general manager for the Gulls from 1990 to 1995 before accepting the same role with the IHL's Orlando Solar Bears. While in Orlando, Waddell was also vice president of RDV Sports and served on the organization's executive committee which oversaw the NBA's Orlando Magic, the Solar Bears and RDV Sports' retail and aviation interests.

Detroit Red Wings
After leaving Orlando, Waddell served as assistant general manager of the Detroit Red Wings in the 1997–98 season, capturing the Stanley Cup.

Atlanta Thrashers
On June 23, 1998, just one week after the Red Wings swept the Washington Capitals in the 1998 Stanley Cup Finals, Waddell was named the first general manager of the Atlanta Thrashers. He served as general manager of the Thrashers until the conclusion of the 2009–10 season when he was promoted to team president, and Rick Dudley succeeded him as general manager. During his tenure as general manager of the Thrashers, the team recorded a 308–401–45–66 record and made their lone playoff appearance after winning the NHL's Southeast Division in 2006–07. Waddell also served as executive vice president and co-chair of the executive committee for the Thrashers' parent company, Atlanta Spirit.

Following True North's purchase of the Thrashers, Waddell announced he would not be moving with the team from Atlanta to Winnipeg.

Pittsburgh Penguins
On January 21, 2012, the Pittsburgh Penguins announced their hiring of Waddell as a professional scout.

Carolina Hurricanes
Waddell was named President of Gale Force Sports & Entertainment, the parent company of the NHL's Carolina Hurricanes, on July 1, 2014. On May 8, 2018, Waddell was named president and general manager of the Hurricanes.
On February 24, 2020, Waddell was named the TSN TradeCentre GM of the Day, for his transactions at the 2020 NHL Trade Deadline.

Career statistics

Regular season and playoffs

International

Awards and honors

See also
List of players who played only one game in the NHL

References

External links

1958 births
Living people
American ice hockey coaches
American men's ice hockey defensemen
American sports businesspeople
Atlanta Thrashers coaches
Atlanta Thrashers general managers
Carolina Hurricanes executives
Detroit Red Wings general managers
Flint Generals (IHL) players
Flint Spirits players
Houston Apollos players
Ice hockey people from Michigan
Los Angeles Kings draft picks
Los Angeles Kings players
National Hockey League executives
National Hockey League general managers
New Haven Nighthawks players
Northern Michigan University alumni
Northern Michigan Wildcats men's ice hockey players
Pittsburgh Penguins scouts
Saginaw Gears players
Sportspeople from Detroit
Stanley Cup champions
Toledo Goaldiggers players
Ice hockey coaches from Michigan
Ice hockey people from Detroit